The Sushruta Samhita is an ancient Sanskrit text on medicine and surgery, and one of the most important such treatises on this subject to survive from the ancient world. The Compendium of Suśruta is one of the foundational texts of Ayurveda (Indian traditional medicine), alongside the Charaka-Saṃhitā, the Bheḷa-Saṃhitā, and the medical portions of the Bower Manuscript. It is one of the two foundational Hindu texts on the medical profession that have survived from ancient India.

The Suśrutasaṃhitā is of great historical importance because it includes historically unique chapters describing surgical training, instruments and procedures which is still followed by modern science of surgery. One of the oldest Sushruta Samhita palm-leaf manuscripts is preserved at the Kaiser Library, Nepal.

History

Date
Over a century ago, the scholar Rudolf Hoernle (1841 – 1918) proposed that given that the author of Satapatha Brahmana, a Vedic text from the mid-first-millennium BCE, was aware of Sushruta's doctrines, Sushruta's doctrines should be dated based on the composition date of Satapatha Brahmana. The composition date of the Brahmana is itself unclear, added Hoernle, and he estimated it to be about the 6th century BCE. Hoernle's date of 600 BCE for the Suśrutasaṃhitā continues to be widely and uncritically cited in spite of much intervening scholarship.  Scores of scholars have subsequently published opinions on the date of the work, and these many views have been summarized by Meulenbeld in his History of Indian Medical Literature. Boslaugh dates the currently existing text to the 6th-century CE.

Central to the problem of chronology is the fact that the Suśrutasaṃhitā is the work of several hands. The internal tradition recorded in manuscript colophons and by medieval commentators makes clear that an old version of the Suśrutasaṃhitā consisted of sections 1-5, with the sixth part having been added by a later author.  However, the oldest manuscripts we have of the work already include the sixth section.

The most detailed and extensive consideration of the date of the Suśrutasaṃhitā is that published by Meulenbeld in his History of Indian Medical Literature (1999-2002).  All serious consideration of this complex question must show awareness of this work. Meulenbeld stated that the Suśrutasaṃhitā is likely a work that includes several historical layers, whose composition may have begun in the last centuries BCE and was completed in its presently surviving form by another author who redacted its first five sections and added the long, final section, the "Uttaratantra." It is likely that the Suśruta-saṃhitā was known to the scholar  (fl. 300-500 CE), which gives the latest date for the version of the work that has survived into the modern era.

In Suśrutasaṃhitā - A Scientific Synopsis, the historians of Indian science Ray, Gupta and Roy noted the following view, which is broadly the same as Meulenbeld's:"The Chronology Committee of the National Institute of Sciences of India (Proceedings, 1952), was of the opinion that third to fourth centuries A. D. may be accepted as the date of the recension of the Suśruta Saṃhitā by Nāgārjuna, which formed the basis of Dallaṇa's commentary."This view remains the consensus amongst university scholars of the history of Indian medicine and Sanskrit literature.

Selected views on chronology 
As mentioned above, scores of scholars have proposed hypotheses on the formation and dating of the Suśrutasaṃhitā.    The following are some of these views that broadly follow Hoernle's old 1907 publication.

Rao in 1985 suggested that the original layer to the Sushruta Samhita was composed in 1st millennium BCE by "elder Sushruta" consisting of five books and 120 chapters, which was redacted and expanded with Uttara-tantra as the last layer of text in 1st millennium CE, bringing the text size to six books and 184 chapters. Walton et al., in 1994, traced the origins of the text to 1st millennium BCE.

Tipton in a 2008 historical perspectives review, states that uncertainty remains on dating the text, how many authors contributed to it and when. Estimates range from 1000 BCE, 800–600 BCE, 600 BCE, 600–200 BCE, 200 BCE, 1–100 CE, and 500 CE. Partial resolution of these uncertainties, states Tipton, has come from a comparison of the Sushruta Samhita text with several Vedic hymns particularly the Atharvaveda such as the hymn on the creation of man in its 10th book, the chapters of Atreya Samhita which describe the human skeleton, better dating of ancient texts that mention Sushruta's name, and critical studies on the ancient Bower Manuscript by Hoernle. These information trace the first Sushruta Samhita to likely have been composed by about mid 1st millennium BCE.

Authorship
 

A person of this name is said in early texts such as the Buddhist Jatakas to have been a physician who taught in a school in Kashi (Varanasi) in parallel to another medical school in Taxila (on Jhelum river), sometime between 1200 BCE and 600 BCE. The earliest known mentions of the name Sushruta firmly associated with the tradition of the Suśrutasaṃhitā is in the Bower Manuscript (4th or 5th century CE), where Sushruta is listed as one of the ten sages residing in the Himalayas.

Rao in 1985 suggested that the author of the original "layer" was "elder Sushruta" (Vrddha Sushruta), although this name appears nowhere in the early Sanskrit literature. The text, states Rao, was redacted centuries later "by another Sushruta, then by Nagarjuna, and thereafter Uttara-tantra was added as a supplement". It is generally accepted by scholars that there were several ancient authors called "Suśruta" who contributed to this text.

Affiliation
The text has been called a Hindu text by many scholars. The text discusses surgery with the same terminology found in more ancient Hindu texts, mentions Hindu gods such as Narayana, Hari, Brahma, Rudra, Indra and others in its chapters, refers to the scriptures of Hinduism namely the Vedas, and in some cases, recommends exercise, walking and "constant study of the Vedas" as part of the patient's treatment and recovery process. The text also uses terminology of Samkhya and other schools of Hindu philosophy.

The Sushruta Samhita and Caraka Samhita have religious ideas throughout, states Steven Engler, who then concludes "Vedic elements are too central to be discounted as marginal". These ideas include the use of terms and same metaphors that are pervasive in the Hindu scriptures – the Vedas, and the inclusion of theory of Karma, self (Atman) and Brahman (metaphysical reality) along the lines of those found in ancient Hindu texts. However, adds Engler, the text also includes another layer of ideas, where empirical rational ideas flourish in competition or cooperation with religious ideas.  Following Engler's study, contemporary scholars have abandoned the distinction "religious" vs. "empirico-rational" as no longer being a useful analytical distinction.

The text may have Buddhist influences, since a redactor named Nagarjuna has raised many historical questions, whether he was the same person of Mahayana Buddhism fame. Zysk states that the ancient Buddhist medical texts are significantly different from both Sushruta and Caraka Samhita. For example, both Caraka and Sushruta recommend Dhupana (fumigation) in some cases, the use of cauterization with fire and alkali in a class of treatments, and the letting out of blood as the first step in treatment of wounds. Nowhere in the Buddhist Pali texts, states Zysk, are these types of medical procedures mentioned. Similarly, medicinal resins (Laksha) lists vary between Sushruta and the Pali texts, with some sets not mentioned at all. While Sushruta and Caraka are close, many afflictions and their treatments found in these texts are not found in Pali texts.

In general, states Zysk, Buddhist medical texts are closer to Sushruta than to Caraka, and in his study suggests that the Sushruta Samhita probably underwent a "Hinduization process" around the end of 1st millennium BCE and the early centuries of the common era after the Hindu orthodox identity had formed. Clifford states that the influence was probably mutual, with Buddhist medical practice in its ancient tradition prohibited outside of the Buddhist monastic order by a precedent set by Buddha, and Buddhist text praise Buddha instead of Hindu gods in their prelude. The mutual influence between the medical traditions between the various Indian religions, the history of the layers of the Suśruta-saṃhitā remains unclear, a large and difficult research problem.

Sushruta is reverentially held in Hindu tradition to be a descendant of Dhanvantari, the mythical god of medicine, or as one who received the knowledge from a discourse from Dhanvantari in Varanasi.

Manuscripts and transmission

One of the oldest palm-leaf manuscripts of Sushruta Samhita has been discovered in Nepal. It is preserved at the Kaiser Library, Nepal as manuscript KL–699, with its digital copy archived by Nepal-German Manuscript Preservation Project (NGMCP C 80/7). The partially damaged manuscript consists of 152 folios, written on both sides, with 6 to 8 lines in transitional Gupta script. The manuscript has been verifiably dated to have been completed by the scribe on Sunday, April 13, 878 CE (Manadeva Samvat 301).

Much of the scholarship on the Suśruta-saṃhitā is based on editions of the text that were published during the nineteenth and early twentieth centuries. This includes the important edition by Vaidya Yādavaśarman Trivikramātmaja Ācārya that also includes the commentary of the scholar Dalhaṇa.

The printed editions are based on the small subset of surviving manuscripts that was available in the major publishing centers of Bombay, Calcutta and elsewhere when the editions were being prepared — sometimes as few as three or four manuscripts. But these do not adequately represent the large number of manuscript versions of the Suśruta-saṃhitā that have survived into the modern era. Taken together, all printed versions of the Suśrutasaṃhitā are based on no more than ten percent of the more than 230 manuscripts of the work that exist today.  These manuscripts exist in the libraries in India and abroad today. More than two hundred manuscripts of the work exist, and a critical edition of the Suśruta-saṃhitā is yet to be prepared.

Contents

The Sushruta Samhita is among the most important ancient medical treatises. It is one of the foundational texts of the medical tradition in India, alongside the Caraka-Saṃhitā, the Bheḷa-Saṃhitā, and the medical portions of the Bower Manuscript.

Scope
The Sushruta Samhita was composed after Charaka Samhita, and except for some topics and their emphasis, both discuss many similar subjects such as General Principles, Pathology, Diagnosis, Anatomy, Sensorial Prognosis, Therapeutics, Pharmaceutics and Toxicology.

The Sushruta and Charaka texts differ in one major aspect, with Sushruta Samhita providing the foundation of surgery, while Charaka Samhita being primarily a foundation of medicine.

Chapters
The Sushruta Samhita, in its extant form, is divided into 186 chapters and contains descriptions of 1,120 illnesses, 700 medicinal plants, 64 preparations from mineral sources and 57 preparations based on animal sources.

The Suśruta-Saṃhitā is divided into two parts: the first five books (Skt. Sthanas) are considered to be the oldest part of the text, and the "Later Section" (Skt. Uttaratantra) that was added by the author Nagarjuna. The content of these chapters is diverse, some topics are covered in multiple chapters in different books, and a summary according to the Bhishagratna's translation is as follows:

Prevention versus cure
Sushruta, states Tipton, asserts that a physician should invest the effort to prevent diseases as much as curative remedial procedures. An important means for prevention, states Sushruta, is physical exercise and hygienic practices. The text adds that excessive strenuous exercise can be injurious and make one more susceptible to diseases, cautioning against such excess. Regular moderate exercise, suggests Sushruta, improves resistance to disease and physical decay.
Sushruta has written Shlokas on the prevention of diseases.

Human skeleton
The Sushruta Samhita states, per Hoernle's translation, that "the professors of Ayurveda speak of three hundred and sixty bones, but books on Shalya-Shastra (surgical science) know of only three hundred". The text then lists the total of 300 as follows: 120 in the extremities (e.g. hands, legs), 117 in the pelvic area, sides, back, abdomen and breast, and 63 in the neck and upwards. The text then explains how these subtotals were empirically verified. The discussion shows that the Indian tradition nurtured diversity of thought, with Sushruta school reaching its own conclusions and differing from the Atreya-Caraka tradition.

The osteological system of Sushruta, states Hoernle, follows the principle of homology, where the body and organs are viewed as self-mirroring and corresponding across various axes of symmetry. The differences in the count of bones in the two schools is partly because Charaka Samhita includes thirty two teeth sockets in its count, and their difference of opinions on how and when to count a cartilage as bone (both count cartilages as bones, unlike current medical practice).

Surgery

The Sushruta Samhita is best known for its approach and discussions of surgery. It was one of the first in human history to suggest that a student of surgery should learn about human body and its organs by dissecting a dead body. A student should practice, states the text, on objects resembling the diseased or body part. Incision studies, for example, are recommended on Pushpaphala (squash, Cucurbita maxima), Alabu  (bottle gourd, Lagenaria vulgaris), Trapusha (cucumber, Cucumis pubescens), leather bags filled with fluids and bladders of dead animals.

The ancient text, state Menon and Haberman, describes haemorrhoidectomy, amputations, plastic, rhinoplastic, ophthalmic, lithotomic and obstetrical procedures.

The Sushruta Samhita mentions various methods including sliding graft, rotation graft and pedicle graft. Reconstruction of a nose (rhinoplasty) which has been cut off, using a flap of skin from the cheek is also described. Labioplasty too has received attention in the samahita.

Medicinal herbs
The Sushruta Samhita, along with the Sanskrit medicine-related classics Atharvaveda and Charak Samhita, together describe more than 700 medicinal herbs. The description, states Padma, includes their taste, appearance and digestive effects to safety, efficacy, dosage and benefits.

Rhinoplasty 
Rhinoplasty, colloquially known as the 'nose job,' is a surgery performed to achieve two results:

 To improve the breathing function of the nose
 To improve the cosmetic look of the nose

Sushruta's treatise provides the first written record of a cheek flap rhinoplasty, a technique still used today to reconstruct a nose.The text mentions more than 15 methods to repair it.  These include using a flap of skin from the cheek, which is akin to the most modern technique today.

The nose in Indian society has remained a symbol of dignity and respect throughout antiquity. Rhinoplasty was an especially important development in India because of the long-standing tradition of rhinotomy (amputation of the nose) as a form of punishment. Convicted criminals would often have their noses amputated to mark them as untrustworthy, but amputation was also frequently practiced on women accused of adultery – even if they were not proven guilty. Once branded in this fashion, an individual had to live with the stigma for the rest of his or her life. Reconstructive surgery, therefore, offered a hope of redemption and normalcy.

The practice of Rhinoplasty slowly started as a result of the need to reconstruct the external nose and later developed to full-fledged science.

Reception

Transmission outside India 
The text was translated to Arabic as Kitab Shah Shun al-Hindi''' in Arabic, also known as Kitab i-Susurud, in Baghdad during the early 8th century at the instructions of a member of the Barmakid family of Baghdad. Yahya ibn Barmak facilitated a major effort at collecting and translating Sanskrit texts such as Vagbhata's Astangahrdaya Samhita, Ravigupta's Siddhasara and Sushruta Samhita. The Arabic translation reached Europe by the end of the medieval period. There is some evidence that in Renaissance Italy, the Branca family of Sicily and Gasparo Tagliacozzi (Bologna) were familiar with the rhinoplastic techniques mentioned in the Sushruta Samhita.New Scientist Jul 26, 1984, p. 43

The text was known to the Khmer king Yaśovarman I (fl. 889-900) of Cambodia. Suśruta was also known as a medical authority in Tibetan literature.

 Commentaries 
In India, a major commentary on the text, known as Nibandha-samgraha, was written by Dalhana in ca. 1200 CE.Other commentaries include Nyaya Chandrika by Gayadas written in 11th century AD and Susrutardha Sandipini by Haranachandra written in 19th century AD.

 Modern reception 
A number of Sushruta's contributions have been discussed in modern literature. Some of these include Hritshoola (heart pain), circulation of vital body fluids (such as blood (rakta dhatu) and lymph (rasa dhatu), Diabetes (Madhumeha), obesity, and hypertension. Kearns & Nash (2008) state that the first mention of leprosy is described in Sushruta Samhita.Aufderheide, A. C.; Rodriguez-Martin, C. & Langsjoen, O. (page 148) The text discusses kidney stones and its surgical removal.

 Editions 
The first printed edition of the text was prepared by Madhusudan Gupta (2 vols, Calcutta 1835, 1836). A partial English translation by U. C. Datta appeared in 1883. The first complete English translation of the Sushruta Samhita was by Kaviraj Kunjalal Bhishagratna, who published it in three volumes between 1907 and 1916 (reprinted 1963, 2006).

An English translation of both the Sushruta Samhita and Dalhana's commentary was published in three volumes by P. V. Sharma in 1999.

See also
 Ayurveda, Indian traditional medicine
 Hindu texts, Indian religious literature
 On Ancient Medicine, Greek medical text, written c. 450–400 B.C.

Notes

References

Bibliography
 
 
 
  Alt URL
  Alt URL
  Alt URL
 
 
 
 
 
 
 
 
 
 
 
 
 
 
 
 Chari PS. 'Sushruta and our heritage', Indian Journal of Plastic Surgery''.

External links
 Sushruta Samhita, Translated by Rudolf Hoernle
 Sushruta Samhita Volume 1, in English, Translated by KK Lal Bhisaghratna
 Sushruta Samhita Volume 2, in English, Translated by KK Lal Bhisaghratna
 Sushruta Samhita Volume 3, in English, Translated by KK Lal Bhisaghratna
 Sutrasthana, Translated by Kaviraj Kunja Lal Bhishagratna
 Nidanasthana, Translated by Kaviraj Kunja Lal Bhishagratna 
 Sharirasthana, Translated by Kaviraj Kunja Lal Bhishagratna 
 Cikitsasthana, Translated by Kaviraj Kunja Lal Bhishagratna
 Kalpasthana, Translated by Kaviraj Kunja Lal Bhishagratna
 Uttaratantra, Translated by Kaviraj Kunja Lal Bhishagratna
The Sushruta Project: The textual and cultural history of medicine in South Asia based on newly-discovered manuscript evidence.  An academic research project at the University of Alberta (2020-2024).

Ayurvedic texts
Hindu texts
Encyclopedias of medicine
Indian surgeons
Indian encyclopedias
Ancient Indian medical works